Odd Fellows Lodge and Temple, also known as the Lincoln Lodge, is a historic Odd Fellows Lodge located near Downtown Syracuse, Onondaga County, New York.  It was built in 1887, and is a three-story, Romanesque Revival style brick building. It features decorative brickwork and was expanded before 1892. It housed a public library on the first floor, lodge related dwellings on the second floor, and the Odd Fellows meeting hall on the third.  It was originally a German-speaking Lodge and vacated the building in 1945.

It was listed on the National Register of Historic Places in 2014.

References 

Odd Fellows buildings in New York (state)
Clubhouses on the National Register of Historic Places in New York (state)
Romanesque Revival architecture in New York (state)
Buildings and structures completed in 1887
Buildings and structures in Syracuse, New York
National Register of Historic Places in Syracuse, New York
1887 establishments in New York (state)